Juan Camilo Restrepo Salazar (born 19 October 1946) was the 10th Minister of Agriculture and Rural Development of Colombia, serving in the administration of President Juan Manuel Santos Calderón. A veteran politician, he also served as the 63rd Minister of Finance and Public Credit of Colombia, the 17th Minister of Mines and Energy of Colombia, the 20th Ambassador of Colombia to France, and as Senator of Colombia. A lifelong member of the Conservative Party, he tried to run for the Conservative presidential nomination in 1998, losing in the primaries, and 2002, where he won the primaries but withdrew before the election.

References

External links
 
 

1946 births
People from Medellín
Living people
20th-century Colombian lawyers
Colombian Conservative Party politicians
Ministers of Mines and Energy of Colombia
Members of the Senate of Colombia
Ministers of Finance and Public Credit of Colombia
Ambassadors of Colombia to France
Ministers of Agriculture and Rural Development of Colombia